Koczała  (formerly ) is a village in Człuchów County, Pomeranian Voivodeship, in northern Poland. It is the seat of the gmina (administrative district) called Gmina Koczała. It is located within the historic region of Pomerania.

The village has a population of 2,111.

Koczała was a royal village of the Polish Crown, administratively located in the Człuchów County in the Pomeranian Voivodeship. During World War II the Germans operated a labor camp for prisoners of war from the Stalag II-B prisoner-of-war camp in the village.

References

Villages in Człuchów County